Kamoike Ballpark, also known as Kamoike Kagoshima Prefectural Baseball Stadium, is a multi-purpose stadium in Kagoshima, Japan.  It is currently used mostly for baseball matches.  The stadium was originally opened in 1970 and has a capacity of 21,000 spectators.

References

External links
Stadium picture

Baseball venues in Japan
Multi-purpose stadiums in Japan
Sports venues in Kagoshima Prefecture
Buildings and structures in Kagoshima
Sports venues completed in 1970
1970 establishments in Japan